Merlin Julius Peterson (December 30, 1901 – February 27, 1977) was a member of the Wisconsin State Assembly.

Biography
Peterson was born on December 30, 1901, in Pigeon, Wisconsin. He attended school in Black River Falls, Wisconsin. Peterson was a stock buyer. Later, he joined the Wisconsin State Patrol. He died on February 27, 1977, in Black River Falls, Wisconsin.

Political career
Peterson was elected to the Assembly in 1960 and re-elected in 1962. He was a Republican.

References

External links

People from Trempealeau County, Wisconsin
People from Black River Falls, Wisconsin
Republican Party members of the Wisconsin State Assembly
1901 births
1977 deaths
20th-century American politicians